Vilenkin is a surname. Notable people with the surname include:

Alexander Vilenkin (born 1949), Russian-American cosmogonist
Naum Vilenkin, Russian mathematician
Nikolai Maksimovich Vilenkin better known as Nikolai Minsky, mystical writer and poet of the Silver Age of Russian Poetry